Rakovo refers to the following places:

 Rakovo, Slovakia, a village
 Rakovo, Kyustendil Province, a village in Bulgaria
 Rakovo, Sliven Province, a village in Bulgaria
 Rakovo, Macedonia, a locality